Huizen is a municipality and a village in the province of North Holland, the Netherlands. 

The name "Huizen" is Dutch for "houses" and this usage has been linked to the belief that the first stone houses, instead of the more common sod houses at the time, in the region appeared here. Huizen is part of the metropolitan area of Amsterdam.

History
Huizen was originally an agricultural village, nearby the Zuiderzee until 1932. During wintertime the farmers went fishing, which started the development from an agricultural village to a coastal village with a thriving fishing industry, which was stimulated by building the harbour around 1850. After the damming of the Zuiderzee due the making of the Afsluitdijk in 1932, the old sea was degraded to a lake, without any economical activities shifted towards industry and commerce.

In the 1960s the town was designated to build substantially large residential areas, to overcome the housing shortage in the region. From then on, the village took on an influx of people and grew rapidly.

Where the Phohi-flat now stands in Huizen was, before World War II, the site of a large transmitter intended for contacting the Dutch East Indies, some 12.000 km away.

A post mill that stood in Huizen was dismantled in 1916. It was re-erected in 1919 at the Netherlands Open Air Museum, Arnhem, Gelderland.

Topography
Huizen is part of the area the Gooi. The Gooi is known in the Netherlands as the home of the rich and famous.

Topographic map of Huizen, March 2014.

Local government 

The municipal council of Huizen consists of 27 seats, which are divided as follows:

Transport
With its population of close to 42,000, Huizen is one of the larger towns without railway connection in the Netherlands. On a national level, it's preceded by Drachten and Oosterhout.

Notable people 

 Henk Bos (1901–1979) a Dutch painter
 Karel Voous (1920–2002) a Dutch ornithologist and author
 Willem Oltmans (1925–2004) a Dutch pro-active investigative journalist and author
 Dorret Boomsma (born 1957 in Huizen) a Dutch biological psychologist specializing in genetics and twin studies
 Arnoud Boot (born 1960) a Dutch economist and academic

Sport 
 Sofyan Amrabat
(born 1993) a famous football player of moroccan roots, fourth place at the 2022 Qatar World Cup, plays in Florentia]]
 Michiel Dudok van Heel (1924–2003) a sailor, competed at the 1952 Summer Olympics
 Nick de Jong (born 1942) a retired sailor, competed at the 1964 Summer Olympics
 Noémi Boekel (born 1984 in Huizen) a Dutch softball player, competed at the 2008 Summer Olympics
 Marlou van der Kulk (born 1993) a Dutch Paralympic swimmer, bronze medallist at the 2012 Summer Paralympics

Gallery

References

External links 

Official website

 
Municipalities of North Holland
Populated places in North Holland